Pierra Makena (born 11 April 1981) is a Kenyan disc jockey, actress and TV personality. She won best supporting actress for her role in When Love Comes Around at the annual Nollywood and African Film Critics Awards in Los Angeles.

Early years and education 
Makena was born on 11 April 1981 in Meru, Kenya. She had her senior high school education at Chogoria Girls High School. She furthered at the Kenya Institute of Mass Communication where she studied radio production.

Career 
Although Makena began her acting career while in secondary school, she joined the Kenyan film and TV industry in 2010. While in school she performed in  several festivals and won awards. Some of the movies she starred in that led to her breakthrough in acting include Kisulisuli, Tausi, Tahidi High and Changes.

She has worked as a news recorder and reporter and producer at KBC, Kenyan's national broadcaster. She also worked as a news presenter at Radio Waumini and YFM, now Hot 96.

Her career as a disc jockey began in 2010 when she left Scanad Kenya Limited to help set up One Fm radio station. She  currently one of Kenya's most sought after and highly paid female deejays. She has played at international events in Burundi, Ghana, Nigeria and America. She's the Founder of Park and Chill event with most cars in Africa.

Filmography 

Kisulisuli
Tausi 
When Love Comes Around
 Changes 
 Tahidi High
 Disconnect (2018 film)
 Just in Time 2021

Awards 

 2014 - She was nominated for the Ghana Movie Awards in the best actress African collaboration category for her role in the movie, When Love Comes Around.
2015 - She won the Best Supporting Actress at Nollywood and African Film Critics Awards in Los Angeles for her role in a Ghanaian movie titled ‘When Love Comes Around.

Personal life 
She is a mother of one child.

References

External links

Living people
1982 births
Kenyan DJs
Kenyan film actresses
People from Meru County